The  was the second season of the Japan Football League, the third tier of the Japanese football league system.

Overview 

It was contested by 12 teams, and Yokohama FC defended their champions title.

Table

Results

Top scorers

Attendances

Promotion and relegation 
No relegation has occurred as league continued to expand. At the end of the season, the winner and runner-up of the Regional League promotion series, Sagawa Express Tokyo and YKK FC were promoted automatically. In addition, NTT West Kumamoto, SC Tottori and Ehime FC were included by JFA recommendation.

2000
3